George Mower House is a historic home located at Newberry, Newberry County, South Carolina.  It was built in 1893, and is a two-story, weatherboarded Queen Anne style dwelling. It features prominent polygonal end turrets and a pedimented dormer.  It was built for George Mower, prominent Newberry attorney, director of Newberry Cotton Mills, and member of the South Carolina House of Representatives (1888-1890, 1910–16) and the South Carolina Senate (1893-1904).

It was listed on the National Register of Historic Places in 1980.

References 

Houses on the National Register of Historic Places in South Carolina
Queen Anne architecture in South Carolina
Houses completed in 1893
Houses in Newberry County, South Carolina
National Register of Historic Places in Newberry County, South Carolina
Newberry, South Carolina